Na-hpan is a village in Mongyai Township, Shan State.

Geography
Na-hpan is located west of the Salween, 20 km to the west of Loi Leng mountain.

References

Populated places in Shan State